Acidovorax wohlfahrtii is a bacterium from the genus Acidovorax and the family Comamonadaceae.

References

Comamonadaceae
Undescribed species